Anna Sophia of Prussia (11 June 1527 – 6 February 1591) was Duchess of Mecklenburg by marriage to John Albert I, Duke of Mecklenburg.

Life 
Anna Sophie was born in Königsberg, the oldest and only surviving child of Duke Albert of Prussia (1490-1568) from his first marriage with Dorothea (1504-1547), a daughter of King Frederick I of Denmark. From her mother, she received an extensive education in naturopathy and gynecology.  Already in 1546, the estates of Prussia agreed to a so-called "dowry tax" to provide the dowry of  guilders she would receive when she married.

She married on 24 February 1555 in Wismar to Duke John Albert I of Mecklenburg (1525-1576). As a wedding gift, her father mediated in a dispute between her husband and his brother Ulrich, Duke of Mecklenburg.  On the occasion of his marriage, Duke John Albert I had the Fürstenhof Palace in Wismar remodeled in a Renaissance style. After the wedding, John Albert I and his bride moved into this palace.

John Albert I and Anna Sophia had three sons; she was described as a loving mother.  John Albert I remained a loyal ally to his father-in-law, in the Holy Roman Empire as well as in Livonia. Since Duke Albert had no surviving sons of his own, he attempted several times, unsuccessfully, to make John Albert I his heir and successor in the Duchy of Prussia.

After John Albert I died in 1576, Anna Sophia retired to her Wittum in Lübz, where she died in 1591. She was buried in Schwerin Cathedral.

Issue 
Anna Sophia and her husband had three sons:
 Albert (1556–1561), titular Duke of Mecklenburg
 John VII (1558-1592), ruling Duke of Mecklenburg-Schwerin from 1576 to 1592, married in 1588 to Duchess Sophia of Holstein-Gottorp (1569-1634)
 Sigismund August, (1560–1600), titular Duke of Mecklenburg, married in 1593 to Duchess Maria Clara of Pomerania-Barth (1574-1623)

References 

 Karl Friedrich Pauli: Allgemeine preussische Staatsgeschichte, C. P. Francken, 1762, p. 458
 Dietmar Willoweit, Hans Lemberg: Reiche und Territorien in Ostmitteleuropa: historische Beziehungen und politische Herrschaftslegitimation, Oldenbourg Wissenschaftsverlag, Munich, 2006, p. 64 f.

Footnotes 

Anna Sophia
Anna Sophia
1527 births
1591 deaths
16th-century German people
Nobility from Königsberg
Burials at Schwerin Cathedral
Daughters of monarchs